Ruhanga literally meaning He Who Creates features in Bantu mythology as the remote creator and sky-God, recognized among the Rutara people (Banyoro, Banyankore, Batooro, Bahaya, Bakiga, Bahema and all other groups referred to in general as Banyakitara). The Bahima further recognise him as the arbiter of life, sickness, and death.  However, unlike creator figures in other religious systems, Ruhanga is generally not a focus of worship.

Ruhanga is also considered to be the founder of the Batembuzi dynasty of the Kingdom of Kitara.

References

Bantu mythology
Names of God in African traditional religions